The 1988 European Figure Skating Championships was a senior-level international competition held in Prague, Czechoslovakia (present-day Czech Republic) on January 22–27, 1988. Elite skaters from European ISU member nations competed in the disciplines of men's singles, ladies' singles, pair skating, and ice dancing.

Results

Men
Fadeev attempted but missed a quadruple jump but was able to win. The podium was the same as the previous year.

Ladies

Pairs

Ice dancing

References

External links
 results
 100th anniversary 1892-1992 International Skating Union : Results 1968 - 1991, Figure Skating Championships, ISU, Lausannes, 1991, pp 227–231

European Figure Skating Championships, 1988
European Figure Skating Championships, 1988
European Figure Skating Championships
International figure skating competitions hosted by Czechoslovakia
Sports competitions in Prague
1980s in Prague
European Figure Skating Championships